In music, Op. 78 stands for Opus number 78. Compositions that are assigned this number include:

 Beethoven – Piano Sonata No. 24
 Brahms – Violin Sonata No. 1
 Dvořák – Symphonic Variations
 Fauré – Sicilienne
 Klebe – Das Rendezvous
 Saint-Saëns – Symphony No. 3
 Schubert – Piano Sonata in G major, D 894
 Schumann – 4 duets (soprano and tenor)
 Tchaikovsky – The Voyevoda